The Romanian National Time Trial Championships are held annually to decide the cycling champions in the time trial discipline, across various categories.

Men

Elite

Under-23

Women

See also
Romanian National Road Race Championships
National road cycling championships

References

National road cycling championships
Cycle races in Romania